Bakhromjon Gaziev (uzb: Bahromjon Gaziyev; ru:Газиев, Бахромжон Валиевич, born September 21, 1979) - is an uzbek sports administrator, Chairman of the Modern Pentathlon Federation of Uzbekistan  Federation of Horse Breeding and Equestrian Sports of Uzbekistan and Polo Federation of Uzbekistan. Executive Member of National Olympic Committee of Uzbekistan and Vice President of the Eurasian Equestrian Association

Biography 
Bakhromjon Gaziev was born September 21, 1979, in Tashkent, Uzbekistan.

Gaziev is a professional show jumper and he has been involved in sports since 2010. He is a master of sports of Uzbekistan of International Class.

 2017-2018 — Vice President of Horse Breeding and Equestrian Sports Federation of Uzbekistan
 2018  — Chairman at the Modern Pentathlon Federation of Uzbekistan
 2019  — Chairman at the Federation of Horse Breeding and Equestrian Sports of Uzbekistan
 2020  — Chairman at the Polo Federation of Uzbekistan
 2021 — Vice President of the Eurasian Equestrian Association

Education 
In 2001, he received a bachelor's degree from the Tashkent Pedagogical University named after Nizami. In 2003, he graduated a master of International Economic relations at the Tashkent State Economic University.

Family 
Bakhromjon Gaziev is married and has 2 sons and a daughter.

References 

1979 births
Show jumping riders
Sportspeople from Tashkent
Living people